Taal may refer to:
An early name for the Afrikaans language
The South African creole language Tsotsitaal

Geography
Taal, Batangas, a municipality in the Philippines
Taal Lake, a freshwater lake in the Philippines
Taal Volcano, an active volcano in the Philippines

Arts and fiction
Taal (instrument), Indian hand clash cymbals
Tala (music) or taal, the term used in Indian classical music to refer to musical meter
Taal (film), 1999 Indian Hindi film by Subhash Ghai
Taal,  God of Beasts in the universe of Warhammer Fantasy (setting)
Taal,  progressive rock band from France

See also
Ta'al (Arab Movement for Renewal), an Arab-Israeli political party founded by Ahmad Tibi
Ta'al is also an abbreviation for tat aluf, Israeli military rank
Talen (disambiguation), the plural form of the word taal